Don't Doubt Your Husband is a 1924 American silent comedy film directed by Harry Beaumont and starring Viola Dana, Allan Forrest and Winifred Bryson.

Cast
 Viola Dana as Helen Blake
 Allan Forrest as Richard Blake
 Winifred Bryson as Alma Lane
 John Patrick as Reginald Trevor
 Willard Louis as Mr. Ruggles
 Adele Watson as Mrs. Ruggles
 Robert Dunbar as Mr. Clinton

References

Bibliography
James Robert Parish & Michael R. Pitts. Film directors: a guide to their American films. Scarecrow Press, 1974.

External links
 

1924 films
1924 comedy films
1920s English-language films
American silent feature films
Silent American comedy films
American black-and-white films
Films directed by Harry Beaumont
Metro Pictures films
1920s American films